Haworthiopsis longiana (synonym Haworthia longiana) is a succulent plant in the subfamily Asphodeloideae, found in the southern part of the Cape Provinces of South Africa.

References

longiana
Flora of the Cape Provinces